Janaki Devi Bajaj (7 January 1893 – 21 May 1979) was an Indian independence activist who was jailed for participating in Civil Disobedience Movement in 1932.

Early life and career 
She was born on 7 January 1893 in Jaora in Jaora State into a  Agarwal family. At the age of eight, she was married to 12-year-old Jamnalal Bajaj, a boy of her own community and similar family, in a match arranged by their families in the usual Indian way. The marriage was entirely harmonious and conventional, and Jankidevi was a devoted wife and mother. At the time of their wedding, the Bajaj family was one of very average, middle-class tradespeople; over the years, Jamnalal would build a large business empire and become one of India's earliest industrialists.
 

Jamnalal participated in the freedom struggle movement, and Jankidevi also took up khadi spinning on charkha, working for Gauseva and the betterment of the lives of harijans and their temple entry in 1928. After independence, she worked with Vinoba Bhave on Bhoodan movement. She served as President of Akhil Bhartiya Goseva Sangh for many years since 1942. She was conferred Padma Vibhushan the second highest civilian award in 1956. She published her autobiography titled, Meri Jivan Yatra in 1965.

Legacy 
She died in 1979. Many educational institutions and awards have been set up in her memory, including Janaki Devi Bajaj Institute of Management Studies, Janaki Devi Bajaj Government PG Girls College Kota and 'Jankidevi Bajaj Gram Vikas Sanstha' established by Bajaj Electricals. The Ladies’ Wing of Indian Merchants’ Chamber  instituted the IMC-Ladies Wing Jankidevi Bajaj Puraskar for Rural Entrepreneurs in the year 1992–93.

Works
 Bajaj, Janaki Devi. Meri Jivan Yatra (My Life Journey). New Delhi: Martand Upadhaya, 1965 (1956).

References 

 
Jankidevi Bajaj's Life - Gandhian Social Worker & True Disciple of Vinoba Bhave

External links
 Jamnalal Bajaj Foundation official website

Recipients of the Padma Vibhushan in social work
Women writers from Madhya Pradesh
Indian independence activists from Madhya Pradesh
People from Jaora
1893 births
1979 deaths
Bajaj Group
Indian women activists
Marwari people
Gandhians
Prisoners and detainees of British India
Social workers
Indian autobiographers
Indian women non-fiction writers
Women autobiographers
20th-century Indian women writers
20th-century Indian non-fiction writers
Hindi-language writers
19th-century Indian women
19th-century Indian people
Social workers from Madhya Pradesh
Women educators from Madhya Pradesh
Educators from Madhya Pradesh
Janaki